Mogokh is a rural locality (a selo) and the administrative centre of Mogokhsky Selsoviet, Gergebilsky District, Republic of Dagestan, Russia. The population was 274 as of 2010. There are 16 streets.

Geography 
Mogokh is located 17 km northwest of Gergebil (the district's administrative centre) by road. Chalda and Maydanskoye are the nearest rural localities.

References 

Rural localities in Gergebilsky District